Karriss Artingstall (born 23 November 1994) is an English professional boxer. She won a bronze medal at the 2020 Olympics, silver at the 2019 European Championships and bronze at the 2019 World Championships. She is a former member of the Royal Horse Artillery. Her partner is middleweight amateur boxer Lauren Price.

Boxing career
At national level, Artingstall won gold medals at the 2012 and 2013 Junior Championships and the 2018 Elite Championships.

In 2019 she won a silver medal at the European Championships, defeating Mona Mestiaen of France (5:0) in the preliminaries; Jennifer Fernández Romero of Spain (5:0) in the quarter-finals; Stanimira Petrova of Bulgaria (5:0) in the semi-finals; before losing to Irma Testa of Italy (0:5) in the final.

She then won a bronze medal at the 2019 World Championships, defeating Yarisel Ramirez of the United States (5:0), Jo Son-hwa of North Korea (3:0), and Mijgona Samadova of Tajikistan (5:0) in the preliminaries; Yodgoroy Mirzaeva of Uzbekistan (5:0) in the quarter-finals; before losing to eventual winner Nesthy Petecio of the Philippines (4:1) in the semi-finals.

2020 Olympics
In a bid to secure a place at the 2020 Summer Olympics, Artingstall competed in the 2020 European Olympic Qualifiers. She won her first bout, defeating Helina Bruyevich of Bulgaria (5:0) in the preliminaries but suffered defeat against Stanimira Petrova of Bulgaria (1:4) in the quarter-finals. Artingstall was able to secure her place after defeating Stephanie Thour of Sweden (5:0) in a box-off.

Her first bout of the Olympics came against Keamogetse Sadie Kenosi of Botswana, with Artingstall emerging victorious with a score of 5:0. Following a 5:0 victory against Jucielen Romeu of Brazil, Artingstall advanced to the quarter-finals to defeat Skye Nicolson of Australia (3:2). She lost her semi-final bout against Sena Irie of Japan (3:2) to secure a featherweight bronze medal.

References

External links

Profile for Karriss Artingstall from GB Boxing

1994 births
Living people
English women boxers
AIBA Women's World Boxing Championships medalists
Featherweight boxers
Royal Horse Artillery soldiers
People from Macclesfield
Olympic boxers of Great Britain
Boxers at the 2020 Summer Olympics
Olympic medalists in boxing
Olympic bronze medallists for Great Britain
Medalists at the 2020 Summer Olympics
English Olympic medallists